National Cycle Network (NCN) Route 688 is a Sustrans National Route that runs from Winterburn to Linton-on-Ouse.

History 
Route 688 was created as an integral part of the Way of the Roses coast-to-coast route between Morecambe and Bridlington which opened on 11 September 2010.

Route 
The western trailhead is at Winterburn  in the Yorkshire Dales, where it meets Route 68, the Pennine Cycle Way. It passes through Cracoe and Burnsall before climbing to the routes high point at Greenhow followed by a steep descent into Pateley Bridge. A further climb to Brimham Rocks is followed by a gradual descent on to the Vale of York via Fountains Abbey and Ripon. From here the route is flat as it follows the River Ouse via Boroughbridge and crossing it at Aldwark Bridge. The eastern trail head is at a junction with Route 65 at Linton-on-Ouse

Related NCN routes 
Route 688 is part of the Way of the Roses along with:

Route 688 meets the following routes:
Route 68 at Winterburn 
Route 67 near Fountains Abbey 
Route 65 at Linton-on-Ouse

References

External links

 Route 688 on the Sustrans website.
 Route 688 on OSM

Cycleways in England